Mirghani Al Zain (born 18 August 1978) is a Qatari retired football player of Sudanese descent. Mirghani is the record-holder for the oldest player to play in the Qatar Stars League at age 41.

Biography
He took part in the 1995 FIFA U-17 World Championship, representing Qatar.

Mirghani is one of the most capped players of all time for Al Wakrah, with 242 caps according to the official Qatar Stars League website.

References

External links

 

1978 births
Living people
Qatari footballers
Qatar international footballers
Al-Wakrah SC players
Al-Gharafa SC players
Al-Sailiya SC players
Qatari people of Sudanese descent
Sudanese emigrants to Qatar
Naturalised citizens of Qatar
Qatar Stars League players
Association football midfielders